Ray Elton (28 January 1914 – 7 May 1994) was a British cinematographer. Elton was employed by Sydney Box's documentary unit Verity Films during the Second World War. He later worked on several Gainsborough Pictures films, once Box took over the running of the studio.

Selected filmography
 The Blind Goddess (1948)
 Miranda (1948)
 A Boy, a Girl and a Bike (1949)
 Last Holiday (1950)
 Smart Alec (1951)
 Two on the Tiles (1951)
 Song of Paris (1952)

References

Bibliography
 Spicer, Andrew. Sydney Box. Manchester University Press, 2006.

External links

1914 births
1994 deaths
Mass media people from Cardiff
Welsh cinematographers